Christopher Gloster (born July 28, 2000) is an American professional soccer player who plays as a left-back.

Club career
Gloster grew up in Montclair, New Jersey, where he attended Montclair High School. He made his debut for Red Bull II against Orlando City B on August 13, 2016, in the 2016 USL season. His appearance as a starter against Orlando City B made him the youngest American to start in a USL game at 16 years and 16 days.

In March 2018, Gloster signed for German club Hannover after having trials at clubs in Germany.

In April 2017, he was named in the United States team for the 2017 CONCACAF U-17 Championship. He played for the United States at the 2017 FIFA U-17 World Cup in India.

On August 9, 2019, Gloster joined Dutch side Jong PSV, the reserve team of PSV Eindhoven, on a three-year deal.

New York City FC
On March 22, 2021, Gloster joined Major League Soccer club New York City FC, with his homegrown player rights being acquired from former club New York Red Bulls.

On May 31, 2021, Gloster was loaned to USL Championship side Sacramento Republic.

On February 17, 2023, NYCFC opted to buyout Gloster's contract with the club.

Career statistics

Club

Honors
New York City FC
MLS Cup: 2021

United States U20
CONCACAF U-20 Championship: 2018

Individual
CONCACAF Under-20 Championship Best XI: 2018

References

External links
 Soccerway profile

2000 births
Living people
African-American soccer players
United States men's youth international soccer players
People from Montclair, New Jersey
Soccer players from New Jersey
Sportspeople from Essex County, New Jersey
New York Red Bulls II players
Hannover 96 players
Jong PSV players
New York City FC players
Sacramento Republic FC players
USL Championship players
American soccer players
Association football defenders
United States men's under-20 international soccer players
American expatriate soccer players in Germany
Expatriate footballers in the Netherlands
American expatriate soccer players
Homegrown Players (MLS)
Major League Soccer players
New York City FC II players
MLS Next Pro players